Operation Full Disclosure was a military operation carried out by the Israel Defense Forces on March 5, 2014, in the Red Sea. After days of surveillance far out to sea, Israeli Navy Shayetet 13 commandos seized the Iranian-owned and Panamanian-registered merchant vessel Klos C that had set sail from Iran, heading for Port Sudan via Iraq.  On board, the commandos found long-range missiles suspected to be destined for the Gaza Strip concealed in containers full of Iranian bags marked as Portland cement.  An unnamed senior Egyptian security official reportedly confirmed that the arms shipment was headed for militants in either Gaza or Sinai. A UN panel of experts concluded that the weapons came from Iran and were being sent to Sudan, accusing Iran of violating the arms embargo.  United Nations Security Council Resolution 1929 authorizes states to seize items, including arms, that Iran is forbidden from exporting.

The operation was led by Major General Ram Rothberg, commander-in-chief of the Israel Navy, on board Sa'ar 5-class corvette INS Hanit. INS Hetz, a Sa'ar 4.5-class missile boat, also participated.

See also
 Francop Affair – Similar seizure of Iranian weaponry on the high seas
 Karine A Affair – Similar seizure of Iranian weaponry on the high seas
 Gaza flotilla raid – Where a ship attempting to break the blockade of Gaza was boarded and seized
 Victoria Affair – Ship carrying Iranian weapons bound from Syria to Hamas in Gaza and captured by Israel

References

External links

 Official press releases and media
 Operation Full Disclosure - Israel Defense Forces official blog
 Operation Full Disclosure - photos at IDF's Flickr
 IDF Intercepts Iranian Shipment of Rockets to Terrorist Organizations in Gaza - photos at IDF's Flickr

March 2014 events in Asia
2014 in Israel
2014 in the Gaza Strip
Aerial operations and battles involving Israel
Arms trafficking
Battles and conflicts without fatalities
Cross-border operations
Counterterrorism in Israel
Maritime incidents in Israel
Maritime incidents in 2014
Military operations of the Israeli–Palestinian conflict
Operations involving Israeli special forces
Iran–Israel proxy conflict
Israeli Navy